The 1963–64 Turkish Second Football league was the first season of Turkish second level football league. The league had 13 teams. Play started on 15 September 1963 and ended 7 June 1964.

Teams

Team summaries

Note: By the end of the season

League table

References

See also
 1963–64 Turkish First Football League

2
Turk
1963-64